The St. Peter and St. Paul Cathedral or just Maracaibo Cathedral is the main church of Maracaibo in the Zulia state of Venezuela. It was built in the seventeenth century. Pope Leo XIII designated it as a cathedral on 25 July 1897 and together with the Archbishop's Palace, is the seat of the Roman Catholic Archdiocese of Maracaibo.

It is located in the Bolivar Square, the historic heart of the city of Maracaibo, and is the headquarters of all churches in the Archdiocese and a repository of its history and traditions. The style is neoclassical colonial, unique to the city, with few such buildings existing within Latin America. It was constructed between 1585 and 1650.

See also
List of cathedrals in Venezuela
Roman Catholicism in Venezuela
St. Peter and St. Paul Cathedral

References

Roman Catholic cathedrals in Venezuela
Buildings and structures in Maracaibo
Roman Catholic churches completed in 1650
1650 establishments in the Spanish Empire
17th-century Roman Catholic church buildings in Venezuela